Terry M. McCarthy (born January 7, 1964) is an American stock car, sports car and touring car racing driver. He is a former competitor in the NASCAR Craftsman Truck Series and Featherlite Southwest Tour. He won the first national sports car championship to be captured by the driver of a Mazda Miata in 1994.

Career
A native of Mountain View, California, McCarthy established a successful career in local and amateur racing, including winning the 1994 Sports Car Club of America E Production National Championship; this was the first E Production national championship won by a driver competing in a Mazda Miata.

In 1996, McCarthy moved up to the NASCAR Craftsman Truck Series, making two starts at the start of the season driving the No. 27 Chevrolet for B&R Racing. Registered as a competitor for Cintas Rookie of the Year honors, McCarthy finished 6th in his first race in the series at Miami-Dade Homestead Motorsports Complex, where he improved 23 positions from his starting position during the race. In the following race at Phoenix International Raceway, McCarthy was involved in a four-truck accident on the seventh lap of the race; a lack of sponsorship meant that that became the final Truck Series race of the season for him, and would also prove to be the final Truck Series race of his career. McCarthy would attempt one Truck Series race in 1997, at the Miami-Dade Homestead Motorsports Complex, but failed to qualify the No. 51 Chevrolet.

Following his aborted Truck Series career, McCarthy went on to compete for a number of years in the Featherlite Southwest Tour, a regional NASCAR touring series, as well as the Sports Car Club of America SpeedVision World Challenge touring car series, and the Mazdaspeed Miata Cup.

Motorsports career results

NASCAR
(key) (Bold – Pole position awarded by qualifying time. Italics – Pole position earned by points standings or practice time. * – Most laps led.)

Craftsman Truck Series

References
Citations

Bibliography

External links
 

Living people
1964 births
People from Mountain View, California
Racing drivers from California
Racing drivers from San Jose, California
NASCAR drivers